The 2022–23 Charlotte 49ers men's basketball team represented the University of North Carolina at Charlotte during the 2022–23 NCAA Division I men's basketball season. The team was led by fifth-year head coach Ron Sanchez, and played their home games at Dale F. Halton Arena in Charlotte, North Carolina as members of Conference USA.

This season marks the team's last as members of Conference USA before joining the American Athletic Conference on July 1, 2023.

Previous season
The 49ers finished the 2021–22 season with a record of 17–14, 10–8 in C-USA play to finish in fourth place in East Division. They lost in the second round of the C-USA tournament to Rice.  The team did not play in a post-season tournament.

Offseason

Departures

Incoming transfers

2022 recruiting class

Roster

Schedule and results

|-
!colspan=9 style=| Non-conference regular season

|-
!colspan=9 style=| Conference USA regular season

|-
!colspan=9 style=| Conference USA tournament

|-
!colspan=9 style=| CBI

Source

See also
 2022–23 Charlotte 49ers women's basketball team

References

Charlotte 49ers men's basketball seasons
Charlotte
Charlotte
Charlotte 49ers men's basketball
Charlotte 49ers men's basketball